Forsat Shirazi Metro Station is a station on Shiraz Metro Line 1 along Modares Boulevard.

References

Shiraz Metro stations
Railway stations opened in 2017